The 16th edition of the Men's FINA Water Polo World Cup were held in Berlin, Germany from September 11 to September 16, 2018. Like the final tournament of the 2007 FINA Men's Water Polo World League all matches were contested in the Europasportpark swimming pool.

Format
8 teams qualified for the 2018 FINA World Cup. They were split into two groups of 4 teams. After playing a Round-robin every team advanced to the quarterfinals. The best ranked team of Group A played against the fourth ranked team of Group B, the second ranked team of Group A against the third ranked team of Group B the third ranked team of Group A against the second ranked team of Group B and the fourth ranked team of Group A against the best ranked team of Group B. The winners of those quarterfinals advanced to the Semis and played out the champion while the losers of the quarterfinals competed in placement matches.

Groups

Squads

Joel Dennerley
Richard Campbell
George Ford
Joe Kayes
Nathan Power
Lachlan Edwards
Lachlan Hollis
Aaron Younger
Andrew Ford
Timothy Putt
Rhys Howden
Blake Edwards
Anthony Hrysanthos
Head coach:
Elvis Fatović

Moritz Schenkel
Ben Reibel
Timo van der Bosch
Julian Real
Tobias Preuss
Maurice Jüngling
Denis Strelezkij
Hannes Schuls
Marko Stamm
Mateo Ćuk
Marin Restović
Dennis Eidner
Kevin Götz
Head coach:
Hagen Stamm

Gergely Kardos
Szilárd Jansik
Krisztián Manhercz
Gergő Zalánki
Toni Német
Tamás Mezei
Dávid Jansik
Gergő Kovács
Ádám Nagy
Bence Bátori
Mátyás Pásztor
Zoltán Pohl
Soma Vogel
Head coach:
Tamás Märcz

Katsuyuki Tanamura
Seiya Adachi
Harukiirario Koppu
Toi Suzuki
Takuma Yoshida
Atsuto Ilda
Mitsuru Takata
Atsushi Arai
Kohei Inaba
Keigo Okawa
Kenta Araki
Tomoyoshi Fukushima
Head coach:
Yoji Omoto

Marko Bijač
Marko Macan
Loren Fatović
Luka Lončar
Andrija Bašić
Hrvoje Benić
Ante Vukičević
Andro Bušlje
Lovre Miloš
Josip Vrlić
Anđelo Šetka
Xavier García
Ivan Marcelić
Head coach:
Ivica Tucak

Strajo Dimitrije Rističević
Dušan Mandić
Viktor Rašović
Sava Ranđelović
Gavril Subotić
Đorđe Lazić
Nemanja Vico
Radomir Drašović
Nikola Jakšić
Mateja Asanović
Ognjen Stojanović
Strahinja Rašović
Lazar Dobožanov
Head coach:
Dejan Savić

Lwazi Madi
Miguel Morais
Chris Brown
Ethan James Jagger Coryndon-Baker
Garreth Prout
Nic Downes
Lood Rabie
Nicholas Rodda
Cameron Laurenson
Mark Spencer
Jason Evezard
Donn Stewart
Head coach:
Paul Martin

McQuin Baron
Johnathan Masashi Hooper
Dylan Woodhead
Alex Obert
Ben Hallock
Luca Cupido
Nick Carniglia
Alex Roelse
Alex Bowen
Benjamin Dutch Stevenson
Jesse Smith
Maxwell Bruce Irving
Jack William Turner
Head coach:
Dejan Udovičić

Preliminary round
All times are local (UTC+2).

Group A

Group B

Knockout stage

Bracket

5–8th place

Quarterfinals

5–8th place semifinals

Semifinals

Seventh place game

Fifth place game

Bronze medal game

Gold medal game

Final standings

Top goalscorers

Source: FINA - Leading Scorers

Individual awards

Best Player

Best Goalscorer

Best Goalkeeper

External links
FINA Official site
FINA - Leading Scorers
FINA - Goalkeeper Statistics
FINA - Overall Team Statistics

References

2018
2018 in German sport
2018 in water polo
International water polo competitions hosted by Germany
Sports competitions in Berlin
FINA Men’s Water Polo World Cup